The College of Wooster is a private liberal arts college in Wooster, Ohio. Founded in 1866 by the Presbyterian Church as the University of Wooster, it has been officially  non-sectarian since 1969 when ownership ties with the Presbyterian Church ended. From its creation, the college has been a co-educational institution. It enrolls about 2,000 students and is a member of The Five Colleges of Ohio, Great Lakes Colleges Association, and the Association of Presbyterian Colleges and Universities.

History

Founded as the University of Wooster in 1866 by Presbyterians, the institution opened its doors in 1870 with a faculty of five and a student body of thirty men and four women. Ephraim Quinby, a Wooster citizen, donated the first , a large oak grove situated on a hilltop overlooking the town. After being founded with the intent to make Wooster open to everyone, the university's first Ph.D. was granted to a woman, Annie B. Irish, in 1882. The first black student, Clarence Allen, began his studies later in the same decade.

It is rumored that when the college was founded, it was gifted a mummy and the head of Nat Turner. While the mummy is still located on campus, at the basement of the art center, the head of Nat Turner was lost in Old Main after a fire broke out.

In the pre-dawn hours of December 11, 1901, a fire destroyed the five-story Old Main building, the centerpiece of the campus.  Within two years, it was replaced by several new buildings which (after substantial renovations within the last 30 years) remain the primary structures for the classes, labs, and faculty offices.  These include Kauke Hall (the center of campus), Scovel Hall, Severance Hall (which together form a large courtyard in front of Kauke Hall, all designed by Lansing C. Holden) and Taylor Hall.

About ten years after the fire and rebuilding, there were eight divisions, including a medical school whose faculty outnumbered those in the college of arts and sciences. However, the university had gradually begun to define itself as a liberal arts institution and, in 1915, after a bitter dispute between the faculty and the Trustees, chose to become The College of Wooster in order to devote itself entirely to the education of undergraduate students in the liberal arts. The enrollment of the college is kept intentionally small, around 2000 students, to allow for close interaction between faculty and students.

In the 1920s, during the clashes between liberal and fundamentalists, William Jennings Bryan, a prominent Presbyterian layman, and former United States Secretary of State, attacked the college for its teaching of evolution. The subject had been taught at the college for several decades and defended by then president Charles F. Wishart. Bryan called for the General Assembly of the church to cut off funding to the college. But in 1923 Wishart defeated Bryan for the position of Moderator of the General Assembly largely on the evolution issue, and the college continued to teach evolution.

The  college has a tree endowment, established in 1987, which supports tree conservation, maintenance, and a tree replacement program.   The Oak Grove, a pleasant green space near the center of campus, plays host to commencement ceremonies each May.  Several of the Grove's trees are older than the college itself, including an eastern black oak near Galpin Hall that dates to 1681, as well as a 1766 white oak.  Each senior class plants a class tree in the Oak Grove on the day before graduation.

On November 10, 2015, the college named Sarah Bolton as its 12th president and first female president. Her term began July 1, 2016. Bolton left the college at the end of the 2021-2022 academic year to assume the presidency of Whitman College. Bolton was a dean and physics professor at Williams College.

Scottish heritage
Wooster's school colors are black and old gold and its mascot is the 'Fighting Scot'. Early Wooster teams were known as the Presbyterians or unofficially as the 'Presbyterian Steamroller' due to the football team's success (the Presbyterian church in America is descended from the Church of Scotland). In 1939, a large donation from alumnus Birt Babcock funded the purchase of kilts for the marching band, in the yellow-and-black MacLeod tartan (MacLeod of Lewis), which had no particular significance, except that it matched the school colors. Scottish culture eventually became an important part of the school's heritage; today, the football games feature a Scottish pipe band with Highland dancers in addition to a traditional marching band, with all three groups clad in the MacLeod tartan. The college offers the "Scottish Arts Scholarship" for students who perform as pipers, drummers, or Scottish dancers.

Academics

Wooster's most popular majors, by 2021 graduates, were:
Political Science and Government (38)
Biology/Biological Sciences (30)
Communication (27)
Psychology (27)
Biochemistry & Molecular Biology (25)
History (21)
Neuroscience (20)

Libraries
The College of Wooster Libraries consists of three branches (Andrews Library, The Flo K. Gault Library and The Timken Science Library in Frick Hall) and a music library located at the Scheide Music Center. Andrews Library, the largest library in the system, houses more than 850,000 volumes and can accommodate over 500 readers. Andrews Library houses the college's Special Collections, media library and the student writing center. The Flo K. Gault Library, built as an addition to Andrews Library in 1995, primarily serves as a place for class seniors to work on their Independent Study projects. The Gault Library contains carrels devoted to Independent Study for every senior student of the humanities and social sciences. The Timken Science Library in Frick Hall (1900, 1998), which is the oldest branch in the system, served as the original academic library for the college from 1900 to 1962. After three decades as an art museum, the building reopened as the science library in 1998, with substantial funding from the Timken Foundation of Canton, Ohio, and now primarily serves students in the math and sciences departments. The library provides Independent Study carrels for math and science seniors.

 CONSORT: The College of Wooster became a founding member of the Five Colleges of Ohio Consortium in 1996. The College of Wooster merged its library catalogue with Denison University, Kenyon College and Ohio Wesleyan University to form the CONSORT library system. The CONSORT library system provides its patrons access to the combined holdings of all four colleges.
 OhioLINK: CONSORT is a member of OhioLINK, a statewide consortium of academic libraries as well as the State Library of Ohio, which agreed to make their collections available to library patrons within this network. CONSORT's membership into OhioLink gives its patrons immediate access to a collection of books, online journals and databases that rivals the largest academic libraries in the country. The OhioLINK catalogue represents 89 libraries in the state and lists nearly 11.5 million unique titles from total holdings of 48 million items.

Art Museum
The College of Wooster Art Museum was established in the 1930s as a small gallery to facilitate the teaching of art and art research at the college. The current museum was established at the Ebert Art Center in 1997. The museum houses two small galleries, the Charlene Derge Sussel Art Gallery and the Burton D. Morgan Gallery, as well as storage for the college's permanent art collection. The museum's encyclopedic collection spans from ancient to contemporary art. Permanent collections include the John Taylor Arms Print Collection - which represents works by Edward Hopper, Winslow Homer, Isabel Bishop, Martin Lewis, James Abbott McNeill Whistler, Albrecht Dürer, Käthe Kollwitz and Félix Bracquemond - the William C. Mithoefer Collection of African Art, Middle Eastern pottery and Chinese decorative art.

Student life

Residential life
The College of Wooster is a residential campus and has 16 residence halls, which house 16 to 270 students each, and 30 program houses. 99% of the student body live in the residence halls on campus. The residence halls include Andrews Hall, Armington Hall, Babcock Hall, Bissman Hall, Bornhuetter Hall, Brush Hall, Compton Hall, Douglass Hall, Gault Manor, Gault Schoolhouse, Holden Hall, Kenarden Lodge, Luce Hall, Stevenson Hall, and Wagner Hall.

International presence
Elias Compton, former dean of the college, founded the Wooster in India program during the 1930s, which established a sister school relationship with Ewing Christian College in Allahabad, India. Over a forty-year time span, Wooster sent several former students to serve as Head Resident at Ewing while Ewing faculty were brought to Wooster as Ewing Fellows; a plaque with the names of Ewing Fellows hangs in Babcock Hall. The Wooster in India program helped build this unique bond between Wooster and India that enhanced the exchange of students, ideas and cultures. This international presence affected the entire campus, establishing a tradition which continues to influence the college. Today, 15% of the student body is international in origin, representing 59 countries. The college offers majors in Cultural Area Studies and International Relations, instruction in seven foreign languages and opportunities to study abroad in 60 countries. Sixty-nine percent of Wooster students are from outside of Ohio.

 Scot Center: In early 2012, the Scot Center, a   $30 million recreation facility, opened its doors.  It includes four multipurpose sport courts (for intramural basketball, volleyball and tennis), a 200-meter indoor track, a new fitness center, batting cages for baseball and softball, expanded locker rooms, coaches' offices and meeting facilities. The building also boasts a  solar roof, the largest of any college facility in the United States. The Scot Center is the first phase of a master plan to create a Campus Center.
 Babcock Residence Hall: Babcock Hall houses 60% domestic and 40% international students who desire to experience this cross-cultural living environment. Babcock Hall offers cross-cultural programming that includes regular hall meetings with student speakers and cultural activities; celebrations of holidays from around the world; and discussions of international and diversity-related issues led by faculty and invited speakers.
 Luce Residence Hall: Luce Hall houses six language suites (Chinese, Classics, French, German, Spanish, and Russian) providing students with a living/learning environment focusing on developing foreign language skills. The building features submarine-inspired architectural details, like a winding floorplan and porthole windows.

Performing arts

Wooster is the home of the Ohio Light Opera, an enterprise founded within the college in 1979, but not part of the college curriculum. It is the only professional company in the United States entirely devoted to operetta. OLO performs the entire Gilbert & Sullivan repertoire, but also regularly revives rarely performed continental works of the 19th and early 20th centuries.  Over the years, the company has produced eighty different operettas.

Wooster's performing ensembles include the Wooster Symphony Orchestra, founded in 1915 by Daniel Parmelee, then Professor of Violin at the college. The orchestra currently is the second-oldest orchestra in continuous performance in the state of Ohio. Additional ensembles include the Scot Symphonic and Marching Bands, the Wooster Chorus, and the Wooster Jazz Ensemble.

Wooster has an active on-campus pipe band. Officially called the College of Wooster Pipe Band, members perform at many official on-campus events such as commencement, sports games (football, basketball, swim meets, and sometimes lacrosse games) and many spontaneous student-run events. During the spring season, they perform and compete at a grade 3 level, having won prizes at the Scots wi' Shotts event in Cleveland hosted by the local Lochaber Pipe Band.  The Pipe Band also placed first in the grade 3 contest at the 2009 Toronto Indoor Highland Games, as the only American band competing.

The college's department of Theatre and Dance produces two dance concerts per year, a fall concert in the round, and a spring concert in a more formal proscenium setting.  Additionally, the college produces at least two plays each academic year.  Further plays are produced by student groups and seniors pursuing their Independent Study projects.  In 2007, Wooster's theatre production of 'Nocturne' was invited to perform at the Kennedy Center's American College Theatre Festival in Washington, D.C. Wooster's production was one of four shows chosen from a field of approximately 400 entries.

Greek life, honor and professional societies

The College of Wooster has hosted numerous fraternities, sororities and honor societies since its establishment. These number more than 80 Greek named chapters, including defunct groups, with approximately 30 active today. The most visible are the college's Greek Academic and Social chapters. However, the Greek System includes Honor Societies and Professional Fraternities, along with Greek-aligned clubs and sections which adopted those terms when the words "fraternity" and "sorority" were discouraged.

There are currently twelve active academic and social Greek groups at the College of Wooster: six sororities, five fraternities and one co-educational group. Sometimes called clubs and sections, these groups are not affiliated with national Greek organizations, and approximately 15% of the student body participates. Wooster's twelve Greek chapters are self-governed under an Inter-Greek Council. Noted by date of founding, social chapters include:

Women's Sororities
  - Pi Kappa (local), 1918, "Peanuts" 
  - Zeta Phi Gamma (local), 1928-19xx, 1988, "Imps" 
  - Kappa Epsilon Zeta (local), 1943-~1980, 2013, "Keys" 
  - Epsilon Kappa Omicron (local), 1943, "Echo" 
  - Alpha Gamma Phi (local), 1983, "Alpha Gamm" 
  - Delta Theta Psi (local), 1992, "Theta"

Men's Fraternities
  - Beta Kappa Phi, 1914 (local), First (I) Section 
  - Phi Sigma Alpha, 1916 (local), Sixth (VI) Section 
  - Men of Harambee, 1989 (local), New Eighth (VIII) Section 
  - Xi Chi Psi, 1991 (local) 
  - Delta Chi Delta, 2017 (local)

Co-ed Fraternities
  - Eta Pi, 1983 (local) 

At least eighteen honor societies are active at the college, including  - Phi Beta Kappa, which arrived in 1926.

Student organizations
The college has a wide variety of student-run media. The Wooster Voice is the weekly student newspaper with a newly launched website, and has been published continuously since 1886 (see list of college newspapers), while WOO 91, which was at WCWS-FM until 2019, is the college's online radio station. 
 
The college also has a successful Ultimate Frisbee program. The Women's team, Betty Gone Wild, won USAUltimate's D-III College Championship Sectionals in 2014 and 2015. Also in 2014 and 2015, they came in second at USAUltimate's D-III College Championship Regionals. They attended the National College Championship in 2014 and came in 15th place.

The college is well known for its Moot Court team as part of the American Moot Court Association, ranked second in the nation in 2017 by the ACMA. In addition to the teams regional championships, the college routinely qualifies teams to the Moot Court Nationals tournament and was the 2008 National Champion. In 2017, Wooster qualified five teams to the nationals tournament and had teams finish 12th, 16th, and 18th in oral argument, 13th and 14th in oration, and third in appellate brief writing.

Athletics

Wooster's athletic history dates back to its first baseball team, in 1880, which played only one game, losing 12–2 to Kenyon College.  The football program was established in 1889; over its first two seasons, the team won all seven games it played, by a total score of 306–4.  Included was a 64–0 victory at Ohio State on November 1, 1890, in the Buckeyes' first-ever home football game.  Shortly thereafter, intercollegiate sports were banned by the College President.  After varsity athletics returned in 1901, Wooster became an early member of the Ohio Athletic Conference  (OAC).  In 1983, Wooster (along with the rest of the Ohio Five) broke away from the OAC to form the North Coast Athletic Conference (NCAC).  The NCAC, which competes at the non-scholarship Division III level of the NCAA, was founded primarily on the principle of offering women equal opportunity to participate in varsity sports.  In its first season of competition, 1984–85, the NCAC sponsored 21 sports, eleven for men and ten for women.  Women's softball was added in 1998, and women's golf in 2010, giving the NCAC its current 23 sports.  Wooster fields varsity athletic teams in all 23 of these sports.

Baseball
The baseball team has made five appearances in the NCAA Division III World Series, including second-place finishes in 2009 and 1997.  Wooster has made 23 appearances in the NCAA baseball tournament under head coach Tim Pettorini, who has led the Scots since 1982. Pettorini has guided the Scots to over 1,100 victories, placing him in the all-time top ten among D-III baseball coaches, and the winningest active coach as of 2017.  The Scots have also won a conference-record seventeen NCAC championships, most recently in 2017, under Pettorini.  Prior to Pettorini's tenure, Bob Morgan led the Scots to the NCAA tournament in each of his final five seasons, giving Wooster a total of 25 appearances since the event began in 1976.  During the first decade of the 21st century, the Scots had a record of 372–98, winning more games than any other team in Division III, and were second in winning percentage over that span, trailing only The College of St. Scholastica.  Following his graduation in 2010, All-American second baseman Matthew Johnson signed with the Toronto Blue Jays organization, and played for four seasons in their minor-league system.

Basketball
Long-time head men's basketball coach Steve Moore has won over 700 games at Wooster, and in 2017 became the second-winningest coach all-time in NCAA Division III.  His teams have won 17 NCAC championships and have made 24 appearances in the NCAA Men's Division III Basketball Championship, including a record 14 in a row from 2003 through 2016. The team reached the national semifinals ("Final Four") of the NCAA D-III Tournament in 2003, 2007, and 2011.  The 2011 team set a school record for victories, with a record of 31–3, and reached the national championship game before falling to St. Thomas (Minnesota).  The 2003 team was close behind at 30–3, with center Bryan Nelson named D-III Men's Basketball Player of the Year.  Home games are contested in the 3,400-seat Timken Gym, which is often filled to capacity for big games, including the rivalry contest with Wittenberg University and post-season tournaments.  Since 2000, the Scots have been in the top ten in D-III basketball attendance every year, ranking second in some seasons, with over 2,000 fans per home game.

Football
The University of Wooster scored the first touchdown in the state of Ohio against Denison University in 188.. Charles Follis, the first black professional football player, attended the University of Wooster and starred on the baseball team before signing with the Shelby Athletic Club to play professional football in 1902. Wooster was the last State of Ohio team not to be beaten by Ohio State, when it tied the Buckeyes at home on November 1, 1924. (as of 2018)
The football team's greatest success occurred between 1916 and 1934; during this era, Wooster had a record of 118-31-12, and won four outright OAC championships.  The 1934 title would be the Scots' last outright conference championship for 70 years, with only a trio of shared conference titles (1959/1970 OAC and 1997 NCAC) during that time. Jack Lengyel, who is known for becoming Marshall’s head coach following their airplane crash that killed their head coach, coached Wooster for five seasons before accepting the Marshall job. In 2004, the team recorded a perfect 10-0 regular season and won its first outright NCAC conference championship, as well as its first NCAA D-III football tournament game.  The 2004 team was led by senior All-American running back Tony Sutton, who set multiple NCAA Division III career rushing records and was a 2004 finalist for the Gagliardi Trophy, the D-III equivalent of the Heisman Trophy.   From 1995 through 2008, Wooster's record was 99–43, making this the most successful era since World War II.  In 2009, lights and artificial turf were added to the Scots' 4,500-seat John Papp stadium.  The first-ever nighttime football game at Wooster was played on October 10, 2009, against Case Western Reserve University, with Case retaining the Baird Brothers Trophy by virtue of a 53–32 victory over the Scots.

Other sports
In the early 2000s, the women's field hockey and women's lacrosse teams each won multiple NCAC championships, earning automatic bids to their national NCAA D-III tournaments.  The only national championship won by a Wooster athletic team came in 1975, when the men's golf team won the NCAA D-III title. They also have two world class, competitive ultimate frisbee teams: the Tippers and the Hawks.

Academic All-Americans
Since 2000, Scots have been named Academic All-Americans 32 times by College Sports Information Directors of America, in the college division, which includes NCAA Division II and Division III institutions, as well as NAIA schools, a total of over 1000 colleges.

Scot Center
The Scot Center is the recreation center for students and alumni at the college. Construction was completed in January 2012 at a cost of roughly 30 million dollars. Home to the Fighting Scots, the center offers a wide assortment of fitness equipment available to both college athletes and the community. It was built to improve athletics and overall fitness at the college. The previous recreation facility for the college, Armington Physical Education Center (the PEC), was adequate. However, an increased demand for high-end facilities pressured the administration and the board of trustees to build the Scot Center.  The 123,000 square-foot facility houses four intramural courts for basketball, tennis and volleyball that are put to use daily.

Governance and Structure 
The College of Wooster's Board of Trustees named Dr. Anne E. McCall to be the 13th president of the College of Wooster on December 8, 2022.

Notable people

 Arthur Holly Compton, Physics (1913), Nobel Prize-winning physicist; member of the National Academy of Sciences; Chancellor of Washington University 1945-1954
William P. Richardson, co-founder and first Dean of Brooklyn Law School
Norman Morrison, self-immolated in front of the Pentagon in protest of the Vietnam War
Donald Kohn, former Vice Chairman of the Board of Governors of the Federal Reserve System
Duncan Jones, British film director, producer and screenwriter; son of David Bowie
John Exter,  American economist, member of the Board of Governors of the Federal Reserve System, founder of the Central Bank of Sri Lanka

References

Further reading
 James R. Blackwood, The House on College Avenue: the Comptons at Wooster, 1891-1913 (Cambridge, Mass.: M.I.T. Press,  1968).
 Lucy Lilian Notestein, Wooster of the Middle West (Kent, Ohio: Kent State University Press,  1971).

External links

Official website
Official athletics website
The College of Wooster Athletic Teams, records, players, and data, 1889–2017
The College of Wooster Athletic Hall of Fame, 1886–

 
College of Wooster
College of Wooster
Five Colleges of Ohio
Educational institutions established in 1866
School buildings on the National Register of Historic Places in Ohio
Historic districts on the National Register of Historic Places in Ohio
Education in Wayne County, Ohio
National Register of Historic Places in Wayne County, Ohio
Buildings and structures in Wayne County, Ohio
1866 establishments in Ohio
Universities and colleges affiliated with the Presbyterian Church (USA)
Universities and colleges accredited by the Higher Learning Commission